Cappaea taprobanensis is a species of insect belonging to the family Pentatomidae

Description 
It is a medium sized black insect with ochraceous markings. These plant feeding insects are gregarious in habit. They can be observed in trunks and barks of trees.

Range 
This species can be found in Sikkim, the Khasi Hills, South India, Sri Lanka, Java and Sumatra.

References 

Insects described in 1851
Pentatominae
Insects of India
Insects of Sri Lanka
Insects of Java
Fauna of Sumatra